Holbæk is a town in Denmark and the seat of Holbæk municipality with a population of 29,608 (1 January 2022). It is located in the northwestern part of Region Sjælland, Denmark.

Holbæk is located on Zealand, on the banks of Holbæk Fjord, an inlet of the larger Isefjord. Holbæk is a commercial and industrial center for the surrounding area. By rail, Holbæk is served by Danske Statsbaner's line from Roskilde to Kalundborg, which runs through the city. Vestsjællands Lokalbaner connects Holbæk by rail to Nykøbing Sjælland. The city is a major hub for the Movia bus routes. Holbæk has an active commercial seaport that serves as the harbor for the ferry to Orø (island). Near the harbor there is a substantial marina.

History

Holbæk is first mentioned in official documents in Absalon's letter of 8 June 1199, in which he granted the majority of his estates to Sorø Klosterkirke in Sorø. It was called Holbækgaard, a larger farm belonging to a nobleman, around which the city eventually developed.

Next it appears in Valdemar the Victorious's book of properties (see Kong Valdemars Jordebog on the Danish Wikipedia) in 1231. Valdmar broke ground for Holbæk Slot (Holbæk Castle) in 1236.

Holbæk grew from then on but is not mentioned again until around 1400 when Margaret I came for a court proceeding that granted her territories in Jutland. The event may have triggered the creation of the first city seal, which shows the three trees by the water that are the prominent features of the current seal.

Economy
Companies headquartered in Holbæk include Sparekassen Sjælland.

Culture

Culturally, Holbæk can be noted for Musikhus Elværket, a converted power station that serves as a concert venue for modern music.

Bogart , Book-café and more
Books gets new life and people new energy at Bogart . For more than 40 years, Bogart was a traditional antiquarian in Holbæk. In 2021 new owners transformed the place into a book café and intimate stage with a mix of concerts, lectures and open mic.

Sport
The city is home to the Holbæk B&I football club.

Transportation

Rail

The Northwest Line connects Holbæk with Kalundborg and Roskilde and the rest of the Danish rail network, and the Odsherred Line connects Holbæk with Nykøbing Sjælland. Holbæk railway station is the principal railway station of the town, and offers direct regional train services to Copenhagen,  and  operated by the national railway company DSB and local train services to  operated by the regional railway company Lokaltog. The western part of the town is also served by the railway halt .

Notable people

Public Service & public thinking 
 Søren Nielsen May (died 1679 in Holbæk) parish priest and provost in Holbæk 
 Albert Borgard (1659–1751) a Danish artillery and engineer officer
 Michael Bille (1680–1756 in Holbæk) a Danish Admiral
 Christen Friis Rottbøll (1727 at Hørbygård–1797) a Danish physician and botanist
 Ole Johansen Winstrup (1782 in Winstrup–1867) a self-taught Danish engineer and inventor
 Ludvig Christian Brinck-Seidelin (1787 in Eriksholm–1865) a Danish civil servant, landowner, and politician 
 Ludwig A. Colding (1815–1888) a Danish civil engineer and physicist
 Edvard Jünger (1823–1899) precision mechanic and instrument maker
 Ellen Nielsen (1871–1960) a Danish-born teacher and missionary in Manchuria
 Mads Tofte (born 1959) a Danish computer scientist, brought up in Holbæk 
 Claus Bjørn Larsen (born 1963) award-winning Danish press photographer

The Arts 
 Paula Trock (1889–1979) a Danish weaver of curtains in distinguished places
 Agnete Hoy (1914–2000) British/Danish potter; expertise in glazing and firing
 Aage Stentoft (1914–1990) composer, film score composer and theatre director
 Dan Sterup-Hansen (1918–1995) painter and illustrator
 Niels Bernhart (1946–2008) a Danish pianist, composer and lecturer
 Inga Nielsen (1946–2008) soprano opera singer
 Søren Reiff (born 1962) guitarist, producer, composer and author
 Cutfather (born 1968) stage name of Mich Hedin Hansen, a Danish music producer
 Jim Lyngvild (born 1978) a Danish designer, writer, fashion columnist and TV personality
 Mikael Brandrup (born 1984) a Danish visual artist and graphic designer in the USA

Sport 
 Niels Tune-Hansen (born 1953) footballer, 220 club caps and 15 for Denmark
 Susanne Augustesen (born 1956) a Danish former international footballer
 Christian Poulsen (born 1981) footballer, over 452 club caps and 92 for Denmark
 Mads Pieler Kolding (born 1988) male badminton player who specializes in doubles
 Mads Mensah Larsen (born 1991) handball player
 Simone Boye Sørensen (born 1992) a Danish footballer, plays for Bayern Munich
 Frederik Colberg (born 1993) a Danish badminton player
 Nick Sörensen (born 1994) a Danish-born Swedish professional ice hockey player
 John Axelsen (born 1998) a Danish amateur golfer

International relations

Twin towns – Sister cities

Holbæk is twinned with:
 Celle, Germany
 Dorchester, Dorset, United Kingdom. resulted from a shared interest in community plays.  Groups of actors from the two towns each took part in the other's community play in the early 1990s and this resulted in the formal twinning in 1992.
 Botevgrad, Bulgaria

Sources
 City History 
 NetBorger.dk Statistics 
 Statistikbanken Statistics

Notes

External links

 
 Official website of Holbæk municipality 
 Holbæk area tourism website 

 
Municipal seats of Region Zealand
Municipal seats of Denmark
Cities and towns in Region Zealand
Holbæk Municipality